Kraaiennest is an Amsterdam Metro station in Amsterdam, Netherlands.

The station was renovated and reopened in September 2013, to a design by Dutch-British Architecture Firm Maccreanor Lavington. The renovations resulted in a Royal Institute of British Architects award in 2014.

References

Amsterdam Metro stations
Amsterdam-Zuidoost
Railway stations opened in 1977
1977 establishments in the Netherlands
Railway stations in the Netherlands opened in the 20th century